Allison Clark Bonnell (March 16, 1801 – August 16, 1875), better known as A. C. Bonnell, was an American politician and businessman. He served as the second mayor of Portland, Oregon, in 1852.

Bonnell was born near Chatham, New Jersey, in 1801.  In the 1840s, he was working in the retail business in Cincinnati, Ohio, until deciding to move west, arriving in San Francisco on November 1, 1849.  He worked as a recorder clerk in the administration of mayor John W. Geary until August 1850, when he moved to Portland, Oregon.

He was elected as Portland's second mayor in 1852, succeeding Hugh O'Bryant. He served as mayor for six months, then resigned to take a long business trip. In April 1853, after his return, Bonnell was elected to the position of city recorder. He served three months, then moved permanently to San Francisco, California.  He died in San Francisco in 1875.

References

1801 births
1875 deaths
Mayors of Portland, Oregon
19th-century American politicians